Liga III is the third-level women's football league in Romania. It was created starting with the 2016–17 season, when it formally received the name Liga II, following the introduction of Superliga as the top-tier league, and the subsequent relegation of Liga I to second-tier. However, as of the 2017–18 season, it was rebranded as Liga III, since the Superliga brand was dropped altogether, and subsequently Liga I became the top league, and Liga II the second.

Format
In its first season, it had only one series, in its second season two series, in its third season three series, and since its fourth season four series. In its fifth season, the number of series was reduced to only two.

Winners
The following is a list of all Romanian women's third-tier football league winners. The first place is declared the champion of the series, is slated for promotion to Liga II, and is presented with a trophy. Second teams of clubs cannot be promoted if the first team of the club is in the next higher tier. The promoted teams in each series for every year are denoted in italics. Because it is the lowest level in the Romanian Football League, there is no formal relegation.

References

Women
Professional sports leagues in Romania